In Fabric is a 2018 British horror comedy film, written and directed by Peter Strickland. The film follows a haunted red dress as it torments various owners. It stars Marianne Jean-Baptiste, Hayley Squires, Leo Bill, and Gwendoline Christie.

It had its world premiere at the Toronto International Film Festival on 13 September 2018. It was released in the United Kingdom on 28 June 2019 by Curzon Artificial Eye and was released in the United States on 6 December 2019 by A24.

Plot

Sheila is a recently divorced bank teller who lives with her teenage son Vince. She gets frequently chastised for insignificant work errors by her bosses and intimidated by Vince's girlfriend Gwen. She visits department store Dentley and Soper's to buy a dress in the sales for a date. Assisted by enigmatic store clerk Miss Luckmoore, Sheila is drawn to a beautiful, flowing red dress, which Luckmoore convinces her to purchase. Sheila notices a strange rash on her chest after wearing the dress. Her washing machine later breaks down when trying to wash it, resulting in Sheila injuring her hand. At night, the store clerks are shown cleaning a lifelike mannequin, which appears to menstruate, as the elderly proprietor Mr Lundy observes and masturbates.

When returning to shop at the store, Sheila learns that there is only one version of the dress and that the store model was killed after wearing it for the store catalogue. Sheila goes on a date with new suitor Zach while Gwen and Vince have sex. As Gwen climaxes, the dress floats above her and tries to suffocate her. When Sheila and Zach go for a walk together, she is attacked by a German Shepherd, which cuts her leg and rips the dress in the process. Later that day, Vince returns home with the dress, somehow fully repaired. After hearing the dress move about in the wardrobe at night, an unsettled Sheila attempts to return the dress to the store but is refused. With the dress in her car boot, Sheila is killed in an accident en route to spending the night with Zach.

The dress comes into the possession of washing machine repairman Reg Speaks, who is made by his friends to wear it on his stag night. His fiancée Babs takes a liking to the dress and wears it to shop at Dentley and Soper's. Luckmoore rebukes Babs for shopping near closing time but is convinced by Lundy to let her stay. Meanwhile, at home, Reg gets hypnotised by the department store's TV advertisement and dies from carbon monoxide poisoning caused by his boiler. Babs recounts to Luckmoore a disturbing dream in which she becomes the model for the store catalogue but gets thinner and ends up being buried in the store. Babs goes into the fitting room while a fight between patrons breaks out in the store and quickly spirals into looting.

The dress catches fire and the flames spread quickly around the store. Babs burns to death in her changing room, while Luckmoore flees down into the dumbwaiter with a dismembered mannequin. As she descends deeper into the store, she sees the dead store model, Sheila, Reg, and Babs stitching together the dress from threads made of their blood, along with several unattended sewing stations implied to be for future wearers of the dress. A fireman observes the destroyed store and discovers the dress undamaged amongst the rubble.

Cast
 Marianne Jean-Baptiste as Sheila Woolchapel
 Hayley Squires as Babs
 Leo Bill as Reg Speaks
 Gwendoline Christie as Gwen
 Julian Barratt as Stash
 Steve Oram as Clive
 Barry Adamson as Zach
 Jaygann Ayeh as Vince
 Richard Bremmer as Mr Lundy
 Terry Bird as Bananas Brian
 Fatma Mohamed as Miss Luckmoore
 Sidse Babett Knudsen as Jill

Production
In September 2017, it was announced that Marianne Jean-Baptiste had joined the cast of the film, with Peter Strickland directing from a screenplay he wrote. Andy Starke served as a producer on the film, and Ian Benson, Lizzie Francke, Rose Garnett, Stephen Kelliher, Patrick Howson, Phil Hunt and Compton Ross served as executive producers on the film under their Blue Bear Rook Films, Bankside Films, BBC Films and British Film Institute banners, respectively. In November 2017, Hayley Squires, Julian Barratt, Gwendoline Christie, Leo Bill, Steve Oram, Fatma Mohamed, Jaygann Ayeh, and Richard Bremmer joined the cast of the film.

Strickland commented that when writing the script he drew inspiration from both the curious nature of second-hand shops and his memories of being taken to department stores as a child, in particular the now closed Jacksons head branch in Reading, Berkshire. He wanted to interrogate the reactions people have to clothing. The dress itself was therefore very important. It also needed to fit a range of body types, so costume designer Jo Thompson made a simple red silk wrap dress.

Release
In March 2018, Curzon Artificial Eye acquired UK distribution rights to the film. The film had its world premiere at the Toronto International Film Festival on 13 September 2018. Shortly after, A24 acquired U.S. distribution rights to the film. It was released in the United Kingdom on 28 June 2019. It was released in the United States on 6 December 2019.

Reception
In Fabric received positive reviews from film critics. It holds  approval rating on Rotten Tomatoes, based on  reviews, with an average rating of 7.4/10. The site's critical consensus reads "In Fabrics gauzy giallo allure weaves a surreal spell, blending stylish horror and dark comedy to offer audiences a captivating treat." On Metacritic, the film holds a rating of 81 out of 100, based on 28 critics, indicating "universal acclaim".

Upon its UK release, The Independent called the film "Suspiria set in a department store" and commented that it was Strickland at "his most free and playful". The Daily Telegraph called him "modern Britain’s answer to Luis Buñuel." Empire enjoyed the "dry, daft wit that reveals itself in surprising ways, from the bonkers premise onwards". Writing in The Guardian, Mark Kermode made it his film of the week and praised the "heady mix of intoxicating nostalgia, clothing-related alchemy and horror-inflected twisted comedy".

Internationally, critics also lauded the film. The New York Times stated it was Strickland's "most impressive, engrossing, imaginatively unchained work yet". Rolling Stone summed up the film as "a singular trip into a singularly warped mind".

In Fabric was included in best of 2019 film lists in The Playlist and Sight & Sound.

References

External links
 
 
 
 

2018 films
2018 horror films
British horror films
A24 (company) films
British supernatural horror films
Films about witchcraft
Films set in 1983
Films set in department stores
Films set in England
Films directed by Peter Strickland
2010s English-language films
2010s American films
2010s British films